Vivian Alan James MacKerrell (23 May 1944 – 2 March 1995) was a British actor of the 1960s and 1970s. He was the basis for the character of Withnail in the film Withnail and I.

Early life
Vivian MacKerrell was the son of Janetta Mary Boyns and Scottish accountant John Alexander McKerrell. He had two brothers, Jock and David.
MacKerrell attended the private Trent College near Nottingham.

Personality
As a student at the Central School of Speech and Drama in London, he shared a house in Albert Street, Camden, London with the musician David Dundas and film director Bruce Robinson, writer and director of Withnail & I (1987). Another house mate, actor Michael Feast, described MacKerrell as a "Splenetic wastrel of a fop", whilst Robinson has said he was a "Jack of all but a master of none", declaring himself a great actor but doing nothing to prove this. Robinson has also stated that MacKerrell was the funniest person he has ever met.

A biography of MacKerrell, Vivian and I, by Penzance-based author Colin Bacon was published in 2010.

Career
In the early 1960s, MacKerrell performed with Ian McKellen in Saturday Night and Sunday Morning and with John Neville in Coriolanus at Nottingham Playhouse, where he also worked as assistant stage manager. In the 1970s, he was the junior lead in Hadrian VII at the Mermaid Theatre.

MacKerrell had only a handful of television and film credits, which included a Play for Today, titled "Edna, the Inebriate Woman" (1971), and Ghost Story (1974), a horror film that also starred Marianne Faithfull. He also appeared in the 1967 BBC television version of Pride and Prejudice as Mr Hurst, for which he was credited as Vivian James, an earlier stage name.

Illness and death
MacKerrell's career was curtailed by heavy drinking. He died from throat cancer, which he contracted in his 40s. After a short remission in the mid-1980s, the illness returned and MacKerrell underwent a laryngectomy. Unable to eat or drink, he resorted to injecting alcohol directly into his stomach. In his last days, MacKerrell contracted pneumonia after a drunken incident and died in Gloucester Royal Infirmary. His ashes were scattered on Loch Indaal on the island of Islay.

Bruce Robinson claimed that MacKerrell once drank lighter fluid and was unable to see for days after the incident. This is depicted in a scene from Withnail & I.

Screen roles

Bibliography

References

External links
 

1944 births
1995 deaths
Alumni of the Royal Central School of Speech and Drama
British male film actors
Deaths from esophageal cancer
Male actors from London
20th-century British male actors
People educated at Trent College
English people of Scottish descent